Melphina maximiliani, the Maximiliano's forest swift, is a butterfly in the family Hesperiidae. It is found in Sierra Leone, Ivory Coast and Ghana. The habitat consists of forests.

Adults are on wing in July and August.

References

Butterflies described in 2005
Erionotini